Iain McDowall is a British crime fiction author. He has written seven novels in his ‘Crowby’ series, featuring the present-day investigations of Inspector Jacobson and his team of provincial police detectives. The Crowby novels broadly follow the conventions of the police procedural but they are distinguished by an unusual narrative emphasis on the point of view of their non-police protagonists. McDowall’s books are frequently concerned with controversial social and political themes. Since 2007, his books, in translation, have also achieved success in Germany.

McDowall was born in Kilmarnock, Scotland. He lives in the English Midlands where his novels are chiefly located. Before embarking on a writing career, he was a university teacher and researcher.

Novels 
A Study in Death (2000)
Making A Killing (2001)
Perfectly Dead  (2003)
Killing For England (2005)
Cut Her Dead (2007)
Envy The Dead (2009)
The Evil Thereof (2014)

References 

1.Mat Coward: Morning Star, 20 August 2007

2.Die Welt / ARTE TV Bestenliste, February 2008

External links 
Iain McDowall's website
bibliography at Fantastic Fiction
Crime Time feature
 Envy The Dead Review (German)
Frankfurt Book Fair reading (video)
Killing for England Review

Living people
People from Kilmarnock
Scottish crime fiction writers
Year of birth missing (living people)